Corne Basson (born 15 December 1967) is a South African sport shooter. He competed at the 2000 Summer Olympics in the men's 50 metre rifle three positions event, in which he placed 44th, and the men's 50 metre rifle prone event, in which he tied for 47th place.

References

1967 births
Living people
ISSF rifle shooters
South African male sport shooters
Olympic shooters of South Africa
Shooters at the 2000 Summer Olympics
20th-century South African people